HMS Daring is the lead ship of the Type 45 or Daring-class air-defence destroyers built for the Royal Navy, and the seventh ship to hold that name. She was launched in 2006 on the Clyde and conducted contractor's sea trials during 2007 and 2008. She was handed over to the Royal Navy in December 2008, entered her base port of Portsmouth for the first time in January 2009 and was formally commissioned on 23 July 2009. As the lead ship of the first destroyer class built for the Royal Navy since the Type 42 in the 1970s, she has attracted significant media and public attention. Her name, crest and motto are a reference to the Roman youth Gaius Mucius Scaevola, famed for his bravery.

Construction
Darings construction began at the BAE Systems Naval Ships yard (now BAE Systems Surface Ships) at Scotstoun on the River Clyde in March 2003. The ship was launched at 14.21 GMT on 1 February 2006. The Countess of Wessex was the ship's sponsor at her launch. On 16 November 2006, the Countess of Wessex brought Daring to life on her first official visit. On 17 November 2006, the countess switched on the ship's diesel generators, part of the 'powering up' ceremony.

Sea trials
On 18 July 2007 Daring sailed on the first set of sea trials (Stage 1.1), successfully completing them four weeks later on 14 August 2007. As she is the first in the class some structural areas needed to be tested, including the loads that the main 4.5-inch Mark 8 naval gun puts on the ship. She sailed for Stage 1.2 on 30 March 2008 and returned on 2 May. Stage 1.2 included trials on the Long Range Radar and navigation system, medium calibre gun blast trials, weapon alignment tests and endurance tests. Stage 1.3 trials were conducted between 26 August and 22 September 2008 and emphasis was placed on testing the full range of communications equipment. The ship's company used the opportunity to conduct familiarisation and training activities in preparation for the transfer of the vessel to the Royal Navy in December 2008. Stage 2 trials took place in 2009, once the ship had been handed over to the Royal Navy.
HMS Daring arrived in her home port of Portsmouth on 28 January 2009 to large crowds along the seafront. She was given the honour of a flypast to coincide with her passing of the Round Tower, just outside Portsmouth.

Operational service

Daring was formally commissioned on 23 July 2009 with The Countess of Wessex inspecting an honour guard on the quayside, and reception. The commissioning cake was cut by the wife of the commanding officer and Able Seaman Daniel Small, who was the youngest member of the ship's company.
Daring was declared officially "in service" one year later, on 31 July 2010.

Daring fired her first Sea Viper missile in May 2011 during a test launch in the Outer Hebrides, after years of trials. During the same year she was equipped with two Phalanx CIWS mounted on either side of the superstructure.

On 6 January 2012, the Royal Navy announced that Daring would leave Portsmouth on 11 January 2012 to undertake her first mission, a deployment to the Persian Gulf. Daring travelled through the Suez Canal on 2 February 2012, then continued on to the Persian Gulf, relieving the Type 23 frigate  that was on station there. In February 2012, as part of the Persian Gulf deployment, Daring joined Operation Scimitar Anzac, an anti-piracy operation in the Red Sea and the Gulf of Aden. This international operation included the Royal Fleet Auxiliary , the Royal Australian Navy frigate , and the Pakistan Navy's PNS Babur. Daring acted as the command ship for all the vessels. During operation in the Persian Gulf and North Arabian Sea, Daring operated with the U.S. Navy's Carrier Strike Group One and Carrier Strike Group Nine.

In September 2013, Daring transited the Panama Canal on deployment to the Pacific Ocean. She made port visits to the US Naval Base San Diego, Joint Base Pearl Harbor–Hickam, and the Marshall Islands. While in the Pacific, Daring took part in the Royal Australian Navy's International Fleet Review 2013 at Sydney and also participated in the 2013 Five Power Defence Arrangements exercise, Bersama Lima. During Bersama Lima, Daring was urgently dispatched to the Philippines as part of the British government's humanitarian response to Typhoon Haiyan. Before her return to the United Kingdom, Daring made port visits in Japan, South Korea, China, Vietnam, Thailand and Malaysia.

On 4 July 2016, Daring fired an Aster 30 off the coast of Scotland.

In September 2016 Daring deployed to the Persian Gulf to assist in Operation Inherent Resolve.

Daring was laid up, pending a refit, from 2017 to 2020.
She began her refit in June 2020 and received a visit from her sponsor, the Countess of Wessex, in 2021 to see the progress of the work. On 15 September 2021, Daring left Portsmouth for the first time in four years under tow bound for Cammell Laird shipyard in Birkenhead to allow work to be carried out installing new generators under the Power Improvement Project (PIP).

Characteristics

Affiliations

Ship's sponsor
The Duchess of Edinburgh

Official affiliations
City of Birmingham
 Warwickshire District Sea Cadets
Guernsey
The Royal Dragoon Guards
No. 11 Squadron RAF
 (Birmingham Royal Naval Reserve)
The Daring Association
King Edward's School, Birmingham
4th Knowle Sea Scout Group
Worshipful Company of Carpenters (a City of London livery company)
Birmingham University Royal Naval Unit
The D-Boats Association
Midland Naval Officers Association
Daring Class Yachts

Notes

References

External links

 

2006 ships
Destroyers of the United Kingdom
Ships built on the River Clyde
Type 45 destroyers